Völkermarkt  is a town of about 11,000 inhabitants in the Austrian state of Carinthia, the administrative capital of Völkermarkt District. It is located within the Drava valley east of the Carinthian capital Klagenfurt, north of the Karawanken mountain range.

Subdivisions
The municipality of Völkermarkt comprises 26 Katastralgemeinden (Slovene names in brackets):

 Admont-Lassein (Volmat-Lesine)
 Bei der Drau (Pri Dravi)
 Greuth (Rute)
 Gurtschitschach (Gurčiče)
 Haimburg (Vovbre)
 Höhenbergen (Homberk)
 Kaltenbrunn (Mrzla Voda)
 Klein St. Veit (Mali Šentvid)
 Korb (Korpiče)
 Mittertrixen (Srednje Trušnje)
 Mühlgraben (Mlinski Graben)
 Neudenstein (Črni Grad) 
 Niedertrixen (Spodnje Trušnje)

 Ob der Drau (Na Dravo)
 Rakollach (Rakole)
 Ritzing (Ricinje)
 Ruhstatt (Ruštat)
 St. Jakob (Šentjakob)
 St. Peter am Wallersberg (Šentpeter na Vašinjah)
 St. Ruprecht (Šentrupert)
 Tainach (Tinje)
 Töllerberg (Telenberk)
 Völkermarkt (Velikovec)
 Waisenberg (Važenberk)
 Wandelitzen (Vodovnica)
 Weinberg (Vinograd)

History
The area, once part of the ancient Noricum province, in the 7th century was resettled by Slavic tribes, who lived within the Principality of Carantania. The migration concentrated around the former Roman settlement of Juenna (near present-day Globasnitz in an area later called Podjuna in Slovene or Jauntal in German. Up to today, significant parts of the population refer to themselves as Carinthian Slovenes. 

The descendants of Count Siegfried I of Sponheim, who about 1035 had come to the Duchy of Carinthia as a follower of Emperor Conrad II, had a trading post erected at the site about 1090, where a church was built soon afterwards at the behest of the archbishop of Salzburg. In 1217 Duke Bernhard von Spanheim gave orders to build a bridge across the Drava River and had the settlement rebuilt in 1231. Völkermarkt was granted town privileges in the 13th century already and developed quickly as an important centre for trade in iron from the surrounding ore mines.

In the Carinthian Plebiscite of 1920, a majority of the population voted for adhesion to the Republic of Austria. On 18 September 1979, the Yugoslav Department of State Security firebombed the Völkermarkt town hall, severely injuring three men, including two of the agents, and causing heavy damages.

Population
According to the 2001 census 2.6% of the population were Carinthian Slovenes.

Transport
The town has access to the Austrian Süd Autobahn (A2) with two junctions. The projected Koralm Railway is expected to improve the area's transport facilities.

Personalities
 Markus Hansiz (1683-1766), Jesuit and historian
 Johann Joseph Peyritsch (1835-1889), physicician and botanist
 Julius Ringel (1889-1967), general of the Gebirgstruppe (Mountain troops) of the Wehrmacht
 Stephanie Graf (born 1973), athlete
 Elmar Lichtenegger (born 1974), hurdler
 Magdalena Lobnig (born 1990), rower

International relations

Twin towns – Sister cities
Völkermarkt is twinned with:
 San Giorgio di Nogaro, Italy

References

External links

Official site (German)
Pictures of Völkermarkt

Cities and towns in Völkermarkt District